George Muirson Totten (1808-1884) was an engineer who built several important canals and railroads, including the Canal del Dique, which joined the Magdalena River to the harbor at Cartagena. He was also the chief engineer of the Panama Railroad with John Trautwine. During the construction of the railroad, Totten had an attack of yellow fever so severe that his companions built a coffin for him.

In 1851, Totten was elected as a member of the American Philosophical Society.

Totten also built the first railroad in Venezuela, from Caracas to La Guayra. Napoleon III gave him a gold ring in recognition for his work. General Guzman Blanco, monarch of Venezuela, awarded him a gold medal.

References 

1808 births
1884 deaths
American railway civil engineers
American canal engineers
People from Connecticut
Rail transport in Panama